Albert Victor Newsome (April 8, 1920 – May 17, 1979) was a Canadian ice hockey player with the Edmonton Mercurys. He won a gold medal at the 1950 World Ice Hockey Championships in London, England. The 1950 Edmonton Mercurys team was inducted to the Alberta Sports Hall of Fame in 2011. He also played with the Edmonton Flyers and Edmonton Maple Leafs.

References

1920 births
1979 deaths
Canadian ice hockey centres
Ice hockey people from Edmonton